This is a list of the 44 municipalities in the province of Cádiz in the autonomous community of Andalusia, Spain.

See also

Geography of Spain
List of Spanish cities

References

Cadiz